No Substance is the tenth full-length album by the punk rock band Bad Religion. It was the band's third (or fourth, if the reissue of Recipe for Hate is counted) release on Atlantic Records, and their second studio album since guitarist Brett Gurewitz's departure.

No Substance was anticipated by both music critics and fans as a result of the band's previous worldwide successes with their 1994 major label debut Stranger Than Fiction and its 1996 follow up The Gray Race. The album has been met with mixed reviews and was not as successful as band's past releases. The album was re-released by Epitaph Records on September 15, 2008. No songs of the album would turn into live staples; "Raise Your Voice" is occasionally played live in Germany due to Campino's guest vocals.

Track listing

Personnel
 Greg Graffin - lead vocals
 Greg Hetson - guitar
 Brian Baker - guitar, backing vocals
 Jay Bentley - bass guitar, backing vocals
 Bobby Schayer - drums, percussion
 Campino from Die Toten Hosen - guest vocals on "Raise Your Voice!"
 Ronnie Kimball - producer, engineer
 Alex Perialas - producer, engineer
 Gavin Lurssen - mastering
 Chris Lord-Alge - mixing
 Jason Arnold - engineer
 Mike Dy - engineer
 Fred Kevorkian - engineer
 Danielle Gibson - art coordination
 Steve Raskin - art direction, design
 Valerie Wagner - art direction, design
 Terry Richardson - photography
 Chris Toliver - photography
 Taylor Nidoski - trumpet

Notes

"The State of The End of The Millennium Address" is written like a speech, very similar to the beginning of "Voice of God is Government" from How Could Hell Be Any Worse?.
 If you dial the 800 number, it will link through to ConAgra Foods customer service (No longer in service - April 16, 2017).
 On the European release, Campino sings alternating lines on "Raise Your Voice". On the US version, he only provides backing vocals.
 The cover art model has been widely reported    as being actress Kristen Johnston, but she refuted this claim in 2019 via a Twitter post.

References

External links

No Substance at YouTube (streamed copy where licensed)

Bad Religion albums
1998 albums
Atlantic Records albums
Albums produced by Alex Perialas